The 1st European Athletics U23 Championships were held in Turku, Finland on 10–13 July 1997. The competition succeeded the European Athletics U23 Cup, which had been held in 1992 and 1994.

Complete results and medal winners were published.

Results

Men

Women

Medal table

Participation
According to an unofficial count, 652 athletes from 37 countries participated in the event.

 (2)
 (1)
 (6)
 (25)
 (10)
 (6)
 (3)
 (5)
 (22)
 (3)
 (4)
 (34)
 (47)
 (55)
 (31)
 (12)
 (27)
 (2)
 (10)
 (3)
 (48)
 (7)
 (4)
 (11)
 (15)
 (39)
 (10)
 (18)
 (60)
 (3)
 (9)
 (36)
 (30)
 (10)
 (10)
 (27)
 (7)

References

External links
Results (archived)

 
1997
European Athletics U23 Championships
International sports competitions in Turku
European Athletics U23 Championships
International athletics competitions hosted by Finland
European Athletics U23 Championships
1990s in Turku
European Athletics U23 Championships